5 kilometr is a rural locality (a settlement) in Kargasokskoye Rural Settlement of Kargasoksky District, Russia. The population was 269 as of 2015.

Geography 
5 kilometr is located 13 km west of Kargasok (the district's administrative centre) by road. Kargasok is the nearest rural locality.

Streets 
 Novaya
 Topolevaya

References 

Rural localities in Tomsk Oblast